A hendecahedron (or undecahedron) is a polyhedron with 11 faces. There are numerous topologically distinct forms of a hendecahedron, for example the decagonal pyramid, and enneagonal prism.

Three forms are Johnson solids: augmented hexagonal prism, biaugmented triangular prism, and elongated pentagonal pyramid.

Two classes, the bisymmetric and the sphenoid hendecahedra, are space-filling.

Name of hendecahedron 
The name of hendecahedron is based on its meaning. Hen- represents one. Deca represents ten, and when combined with the polyhedron suffix -hedron, the name becomes Hendecahedron.

Common hendecahedron 
In all the convex hendecahedrons, there are a total of 440,564 convex ones with distinct differences in topology. There are significant differences in the structure of topology, which means two types of polyhedrons cannot be transformed by moving vertex positions, twisting, or scaling, such as a pentagonal pyramid and a nine diagonal column. They can't change with each other, so their topology structure is different. But the pentagonal prism and enneagonal prism can interchange by stretching out or drawing back one of the nine sides of the scale, so the triangulum prism and the triangulum pyramid have no obvious difference in topology.

The common hendecahedrons are cones, cylinders, some Jason polyhedrons, and the semi-regular polyhedron. The semi-regular polyhedron here is not the Archimedean solid, but the enneagonal prism.

Other hendecahedrons include enneagonal prism, Spherical octagonal pyramid, two side taper triangular prism of the duality of six, side cone Angle and bisymmetric hendecahedron, which can close shop space.

Bisymmetric hendecahedron 
The bisymmetric hendecahedron is a space-filling polyhedron which can be assembled into layers of interpenetrating "boat-shaped" tetramers, which in turn are then stacked to fill space; it is hence a three-dimensional analogue of the Cairo pentagon.

Sphenoid hendecahedron 
The sphenoid hendecahedron is a space-filling polyhedron which can be assembled into layers of the Floret tiling, which in turn are stacked to fill space.

Hendecahedron in chemistry 
In the chemistry, after removing all 18 sides in borane hydrogen ions ([B11H11]), it is an Octadecahedron. If making a perpendicular to the center of gravity to the surface of a boron atom, a new polyhedron is constructed, which is 18 surface structures of the dual polyhedron, also one of hendecahedrons.

Convex
There are 440,564 topologically distinct convex hendecahedra, excluding mirror images, having at least 8 vertices. (Two polyhedra are "topologically distinct" if they have intrinsically different arrangements of faces and vertices, such that it is impossible to distort one into the other simply by changing the lengths of edges or the angles between edges or faces.)

References

 Thomas H. Sidebotham. The A to Z of Mathematics: A Basic Guide. John Wiley & Sons. 2003: 237. 
 Steven Dutch: How Many Polyhedra are There? (http://www.uwgb.edu/dutchs/symmetry/POLYHOW M.HTM)
 Counting polyhedra (http://www.numericana.com/data/polycount.htm) numericana.com [2016-1-10]
 Inchbald, Guy. "Five Space-Filling Polyhedra." The Mathematical Gazette 80, no. 489 (November 1996): 466-475
 Space-Filling Bisymmetric Hendecahedron. [2013-04-11]
 Anderson, Ian. "Constructing Tournament Designs." The Mathematical Gazette 73, no. 466 (December 1989): 284-292
 Holleman, A. F.; Wiberg, E., Inorganic Chemistry, San Diego: Academic Press: 1165, 2001,

External links

Polyhedra